The Southern Whaling and Sealing Company Ltd (SWSC) were a United Kingdom-based whaling and sealing company, originally formed in 1911 by the partnership of Richard Irvin & Sons of North Shields and the South African-based fishing company Irvin & Johnson. Latterly they were sold to Lever Bros., in 1919 and re-sold to Christian Salvesen Ltd in 1941.

Early days

Richard Irvin & Sons
Richard Irvin was born in North Shields in 1853, entering the fishing trade in 1864 at age 11. He quickly saw the potential growth of trawl fishing.

Richard Irvin & Sons had already established the Shields Engineering Co and, after purchasing Youngs Dock Co., merged them to become Shields Engineering & Dry Dock Co. Latterly they then became involved in the herring drifting fishery around the same time as steam powered drifters began to be used in NE England and Scotland. The East Coast Herring Drifter Co. was set up in 1900 followed soon after by the Shields Ice & Cold Storage Co. Ltd.

In 1902, Richard's second eldest son, George Driver Irvin was sent to South Africa to investigate the fishing potential there where George established The African Fishing & Trading Co. in 1903, with offices in Cape Town & North Shields.

Irvin & Johnson
However, the African Fishing & Trading Co. was not profitable and only continued to operate after a merger with another South African fishing company owned by Swedish pioneer Carl Ossian Johnson (1867-1949) in 1909. This merger subsequently lead to the establishment of the firm, Irvin & Johnson in Dec 1910.

Foundation
In July 1911 Richard Irvin & Sons were granted a licence to engage in whaling from Prince Olav Harbour in South Georgia, and in partnership with Irvin & Johnson, formed a new company, The Southern Whaling & Sealing Company Ltd (SWSC). George Driver Irvin was made Managing Director.

During 1911 they bought Sound of Jura, to be used as a cargo transporter, and also purchased a second hand ship, the Restitution.

The shipbuilding firm of Smith's Dock Co., Middlesbrough were commissioned to construct two steel 92 ft. diesel-powered whale catchers as well as fit a diesel auxiliary in Sound of Jura. However, the diesel engine proved to be unreliable and felt to be too noisy in scaring off the whales, so was replaced by a steam engine.

As well as having a whaling lease at Prince Olav Harbour, South Georgia, SWSC established a station at Port Alexander in Angola. They also undertook some sealing expeditions to Marion & Prince Edward Islands from Cape Town, but these proved unsustainable.

The 1916–17 season failed to produce any whale oil and saw the commencement of the construction of the shore station at Prince Olav Harbour.

SWSC worked in co-operation with Salvesen's at Leith Harbour in 1915–17 to produce as much blubber oil as possible for the war effort in Europe.

Lever Brothers ownership
In 1919 SWSC was sold to Lever Brothers. Lever Bros. developed and modernized the Prince Olav Harbour and operated it until it was closed in 1931.

Lever Bros., who later became Unilever, sold the company to Christian Salvesen Ltd in 1941 when they moved out of the whaling business. This increased Salvesen's fleet by two factory ships and 15 catchers.

Fleet

Whaling stations in South Georgia
The first whaling enterprise on Grytviken, South Georgia on 16 November 1904 by a Norwegian, Carl Anton Larsen. Larsen was manager of Compañía Argentina de Pesca and became a naturalised British citizen. His company was relatively successful in its early years of operation and huge interest in obtaining whaling licences followed. The British Government then imposed restrictions on their issue and conditions to ensure that the complete whale was to be processed rather than just the blubber, to try to sustain the industry.

By 1912, seven whaling stations had been established and South Georgia became known as the southern capital of whaling.

Two other whaling leases were granted, to Rosita Harbour and Jason Harbour but they were never used as whaling sites, and were only used for refuge by the ships.

The shore-based whaling industry on South Georgia declined due to the scarcity of whales around the island and with the rise in pelagic whaling using factory ships. South Georgia then became used for repair, maintenance and storage.

References

External links
 SV Sound of Jura, Clyde Built Ships
 SV Sound of Jura, first hand accounts of her early voyages
 Capt William Williams, Master of Southern King

Whaling firms
Defunct shipping companies of the United Kingdom
1911 establishments in England
British companies established in 1911
Transport companies established in 1911
Sealers